The 2021–22 Algerian Women's Elite Championship was the 24th season of the Algerian Women's Championship, the Algerian national women's association football competition. Afak Relizane won the competition for the tenth time and will partiticipate to the 2022 CAF Women's Champions League.

Clubs

Standings

Statistics

Best goalscorers
 Djamila Benaissa (CF Akbou)

References

External links
Results of 2021–22 Division Nationale "Elite" Seniors - lff.dz

Algerian Women's Championship seasons